The list of shipwrecks in July 1939 includes ships sunk, foundered, grounded, or otherwise lost during July 1939.

2 July

4 July

5 July

6 July

8 July

9 July

10 July

11 July

12 July

14 July

15 July

18 July

19 July

21 July

22 July

24 July

25 July

27 July

31 July

References

1939-07
 07